Meynnart Wewyck or  Maynard Vewicke was a Netherlandish painter, active ca. 1502–1525 in England. Wewyck was employed as an artist at the court of Henry VII of England and, after his death, by his son Henry VIII. He also spent a brief period at the court of James IV of Scotland. Surviving documentation associates Wewyck with portraits of several members of the royal family, and with drawings for the tomb of Lady Margaret Beaufort, mother of Henry VII, at Westminster Abbey. New research published in 2019 has identified a portrait of Lady Margaret Beaufort in the Master's Lodge at St John's College, Cambridge as by Wewyck, and also attributes a painting of Henry VII at the Society of Antiquaries of London to his hand.  In follow-on work, a group of researchers suggests that four surviving portraits of Henry VIII and two of his mother, Elizabeth of York, should also be attributed to Wewyck.

Career 
Wewyck was one of the earliest artists of the Tudor court and his long career working for Henry VII and Henry VIII is well-documented. The richness of this documentation is suggested by the recorded variants of his name. On 19 September 1502 "Mynour, the Inglis payntour" (that is, the painter to the English court) delivered four portraits of the English royal family to James IV of Scotland at Stirling Castle. These included pictures of Henry, Queen Elizabeth of York, Prince Henry (later Henry VIII), and Princess Margaret, who had been married by proxy to James in January 1502. Wewyck remained at the Scottish court until November 1503, when he returned to England.

The Scottish royal accounts record the king's gift of 50 French crowns or £35 Scots to "Mynour, the Inglis payntour" on 10 November. A portrait of James IV at Abbotsford House bearing the date "1502" has been attributed to Wewyck. The inventory of Henry VIII lists a portrait of James IV presumably by Wewyck.

Lady Margaret Beaufort was the mother of Henry VII and the foundress of St John's College and Christ's College, Cambridge. In 1506, her executors (among them John Fisher, Bishop of Rochester) paid "Maynard Waywike Duchman" for her likeness; this supports the consensus that the artist was likely Netherlandish. In 1510 Wewyck was hired by the executors to devise a "table" (painting) and "patrones" (pattern drawings) for Lady Margaret's tomb, to be sculpted by Pietro Torrigiano for Henry VII's chapel in Westminster Abbey. Surviving receipts from 1511 and 1512 document payments for this work. One of these records both a typical English variant and Wewyck's own spelling of his name:

Wewyck was recorded as resident in the parish of All Hallows the Great in London in 1523.  He was still alive in 1525; the accounts of Henry VIII record a half-yearly payment to "olde maynerd wewoke paynter" in September of that year.

Works

As the first painter of portraits appointed by an English king, Wewyck "almost certainly painted the originals" of a widely copied set of similar bust-length portraits of Henry VII, Elizabeth of York, Prince Arthur, Prince Henry, and Lady Margaret Beaufort. Henry VII paid him £1 for pictures in March 1505.

However, no surviving paintings could be firmly ascribed to the artist before 2019. On 29 March 2019, St John's College, Cambridge announced that new research had identified a portrait of Lady Margaret Beaufort, mother of Henry VII and foundress of the college, as an original work by Wewyck. The portrait was commissioned ca. 1510 (the year after her death) by John Fisher, Bishop of Rochester, and transferred to St John's in 1534, at the time of Rochester's fall from grace. It now hangs in the Master's Lodge at the college. Art historians Dr Charlotte Bolland of the National Gallery, London and Dr Andrew Chen of St John's published their research in the April 2019 issue of The Burlington Magazine.

Their confident attribution to Wewyck draws on "new archival, scientific and stylistic evidence", including previously unpublished documents, and concludes that the painting is "[p]robably the earliest known large-scale portrait of an English woman". A copy painted by Rowland Lockey ca. 1598 preserves details obscured by darkened varnish and paint loss on the original. Based on their work with the portrait of Lady Margaret Beaufort, they also attributed a stylistically and structurally similar portrait of Henry VII held by the Society of Antiquaries of London to Wewyck.

Dr Chen described the significance of these discoveries: “These paintings can serve as touchstones for further research into Wewyck’s work. As perhaps the first Netherlandish painter to find work at the Tudor court, Wewyck stands at the beginning of a process of the transfer of artistic skills that would dominate the production of painted portraiture in England throughout the 16th century.”

That further research occurred rapidly: later in 2019, a group of specialists from the Yale Center for British Art, with support from the National Portrait Gallery, London, and the Hamilton Kerr Institute, Cambridge, initiated a research project at the Denver Art Museum. Their work identified four portraits of Henry VIII (two as prince and two as king) and two portraits of his mother, Elizabeth of York, which they are "fairly certain" are attributable to Wewyck.  Additionally, they determined that the portrait of Henry VII at the Society of Antiquaries, the 1509 portrait of Prince Henry in the Denver Museum of Art, and three other portraits of Henry VIII (one at Anglesey Abbey and two in private collections) were all painted on panels of Baltic oak cut from the same tree.

The Great Hall of Richmond Palace was decorated with a series of portraits of English kings, placed between the windows, including Henry VII. It has been suggested that these pictures were the work of Maynard the painter. However, a later description of the hall mentions eleven statues, which were perhaps the series of monarchs mentioned by the earlier writer.

References

External links
 

Netherlandish Renaissance painters
Tudor England
English art
16th-century English painters
English male painters
Court painters
Material culture of royal courts
Date of birth unknown
Date of death unknown